Longfengxi  is a station on Line 6 of Chongqing Rail Transit in Chongqing Municipality, China. It is located in Beibei District. It opened in 2013.

Station structure

References

Jiangbei District, Chongqing
Railway stations in Chongqing
Railway stations in China opened in 2013
Chongqing Rail Transit stations